Şanlıurfa Airport  was an airport in Şanlıurfa Province, Turkey.

References

External links

Defunct airports in Turkey
Buildings and structures in Şanlıurfa Province